This is a list of ancient Buddhist viharas and archeological sites in Bangladesh.

References

External links
 

Bangladesh, Buddhist viharas
Archaeological sites in Bangladesh
 
Viharas
Bangladesh
Viharas
Bangladesh
Lists of tourist attractions in Bangladesh